Detonti (also De Tonti) is an unincorporated community in Saline County, Arkansas, United States.

Notes

Unincorporated communities in Saline County, Arkansas
Unincorporated communities in Arkansas